Turkey competed at the 2007 Summer Universiade in Bangkok, Thailand from 8 August to 18 August 2007.

Turkey won nine medals (17th place), including three gold, three silver and four bronze medals.

Medal table

Athletics

Men's

Women's

Judo

Women's

Taekwondo

Men's

Women's

Volleyball

Men's tournament

Final standing

References

Nations at the 2007 Summer Universiade
Summer Universiade
2007